Juliette Dubufe (née Zimmerman) (1819 – 6 August 1855) was a French sculptor.

Wife of the painter Édouard Dubufe, Juliette was the elder sister of Anna, wife of composer Charles Gounod. They were the daughters of composer and piano instructor Pierre-Joseph-Guillaume Zimmerman. The Dubufes were the parents of painter Guillaume Dubufe. A pianist as well as a sculptor, Juliette exhibited a bust of Paul Delaroche at the Paris Salon of 1844. She died in childbirth at Auteuil.

A medal by Dubufe, Paul Hugues Christofle of 1846, is owned by the National Gallery of Art.

References 

1819 births
1855 deaths
French women sculptors
19th-century French sculptors
19th-century French women artists
Deaths in childbirth